Alemayehu Shumye Tafere (1988 – 11 January 2013; Addis Ababa, Ethiopia) was an Ethiopian long-distance runner who specialised in marathon running.

Born in Nazret, he took up running seriously in 2004 when he moved to Addis Ababa with the hope of emulating the success of Haile Gebrselassie. He made his marathon debut in 2008 at the Marathon del Riso in Vercelli and won the race in a time of 2:14:33. He ran in two other marathons that year, winning the Warsaw Marathon in 2:11:50 – a course record and personal best – and then breaking the course record to win the Beirut Marathon in November. He came tenth at the Zurich Marathon in 2009 and significantly improved his personal best at the Frankfurt Marathon, running a time of 2:08:46 for fifth place as the only non-Kenyan to reach the top eight.

He was among the leaders of the Xiamen Marathon in January 2010, but fell back at the 35 km mark, eventually taking fifth place. He returned to the race the following year and took third place in 2:09:58, his second sub-2:10 clocking. In his second run of 2011 he finished in the top five of the Rotterdam Marathon, again running under two hours and ten minutes. He was one of six men to go under the previous course record at the Ljubljana Marathon in October, but did not make the podium with his fifth-place finish. Shumye won the Gold Coast Marathon on 1 July 2012 in Gold Coast, Queensland, Australia.

He died in a car accident in Addis Ababa on January 11, 2013, aged 24 years.

References

External links

1988 births
2013 deaths
Sportspeople from Oromia Region
Ethiopian male long-distance runners
Ethiopian male marathon runners
Road incident deaths in Ethiopia
20th-century Ethiopian people
21st-century Ethiopian people